Daniel Álvarez Palomero (born April 2, 1971 in Zaragoza, Spain) is a retired basketball player.

Clubs
 1989-94: CAI Zaragoza
 1994: Pamesa Valencia
 1995-98: CB Breogán
 1998: Menorca Bàsquet
 1999-00: Caceres Club Baloncesto

References
ACB profile

1971 births
Spanish men's basketball players
Liga ACB players
Valencia Basket players
CB Breogán players
Menorca Bàsquet players
Point guards
Sportspeople from Zaragoza
Living people
CB Zaragoza players